Saxon Harbor is located on Lake Superior's Oronto Bay in Iron County, Wisconsin, United States. The harbor, adjacent to Oronto Creek, is a part of a county park that includes deep sea fishing, camping and a sandy beach stretching for four miles westward. Historically, this was near the beginning of an ancient Native American trade route known as the Flambeau Trail and was the site of a fur trading post operated by John Jacob Astor's American Fur Company from 1808 to 1830.

In 2006, a $2.17 million expansion to the harbor was completed. Primarily funded by a Section 154 grant set up by U.S. Representative Dave Obey, the project added a new harbor basin, shoreline protection, new docks and restroom facilities and American Disability Act-complaint sidewalks.

On the night of July 11, 2016, a major storm destroyed the harbor. Oronto Creek spilled over its banks, washing down trees and brush; its water flowed into the harbor, washing away boats, vehicles, asphalt, concrete, and trailers at the campground. One fatality occurred at the harbor. It has since been rebuilt.

References

Geography of Iron County, Wisconsin
Ports and harbors of Wisconsin